Russell "Doss" Rebholz (September 11, 1908 – August 1, 2002) was a professional football player for the Winnipeg Blue Bombers and later a high school and college football and basketball coach.

College
A native of Portage, Wisconsin, Rebholz was a letter winner in football from 1929 to 1931 and in basketball from 1930 to 1931 at the University of Wisconsin. In 1930, he led the Midwest, Big Ten, and UW in scoring, with 48 points. Rebholz played in the 1932 East-West Shrine Game.

Professional football
In 1932, Rebholz played for and coached the Salamander Water Polo Club In Japan. From 1933 to 1938, he was a player/coach for the Winnipeg Blue Bombers football team, which won the 1935 Grey Cup. Nicknamed "The Wisconsin Wraith" while with the Blue Bombers, he wore jersey number 66.

Rebholz was one of the first two football imports to arrive in Canada from the United States. A versatile halfback, he was known for his passing, running, blocking, and kicking abilities. In a 1934 exhibition game, he threw one of the longest passes ever, 68 yards in the air, to Lynn Patrick for a touchdown.  In the 1935 Grey Cup game, he threw two touchdown passes and led the Blue Bombers to a Dominion Championship over the favored Hamilton Tigers from the East.

He was elected a charter member of the Canadian Football Hall of Fame on November 27, 1963, and the Winnipeg Blue Bomber Hall of Fame in 1984.

Coaching career
During his coaching career, Rebholz served at Stevens Point, Racine Horlick High School and the University of Wisconsin–Milwaukee in a variety of positions, earning six Coach of the Year honors.

While at Horlick High School, he led the team to a winning season in men's basketball.  The community started calling the team Rebholz's Rebels for their style of play, and the nickname stuck. Rebels is now one of the two official nicknames for the school's athletic teams.

Between 1952 and 1963, Rebholz compiled a .539 winning percentage (123-105) while coaching the University of Wisconsin–Milwaukee men's basketball team.  He was 58-42 in his first 100 games as the coach at UW–Milwaukee, which is second best in the school's history, behind former Tennessee Volunteers coach Bruce Pearl, who was 66-34 in his first 100 games at the university.  In the 1959-1960 season, the team went 18-4 overall and 10-2 in the Wisconsin Intercollegiate Athletic Conference (WIAC) and were the NCAA College Division Regional Third Place team.  It was the first time the school had made it to the post-season.  They lost to Lincoln and beat Augustana College.  The Panthers were nicknamed the Cardinals at the time.

In 2000, Rebholz was inducted into the University of Wisconsin/National W Club Hall of Fame.

Head coaching record

Basketball

References

1908 births
2002 deaths
American expatriate sportspeople in Canada
American football halfbacks
American men's basketball coaches
American players of Canadian football
Basketball coaches from Wisconsin
Basketball players from Wisconsin
Canadian football running backs
College men's basketball head coaches in the United States
Milwaukee Panthers men's basketball coaches
Wisconsin Badgers football players
Wisconsin Badgers men's basketball players
Winnipeg Blue Bombers players
People from Portage, Wisconsin
Players of American football from Wisconsin
Canadian Football Hall of Fame inductees
American men's basketball players